The Waterloo Public Library (abbreviated as WPL) is the public library system for Waterloo, Ontario, Canada. Founded in 1888, the library has four branches, as of May 2022.

Services 
The three branches offer print and digital resources, programs for all ages. The John M. Harper Branch has bookable study rooms and non-commercial groups. This branch and the Main Library both have rooms for rent for commercial groups. The Main Branch has a VHS tape converter.

History 
The Waterloo Mechanics' Institute purchased their first books in 1876 and stored them on a table in Town Hall.  This was the forerunner of the Waterloo Public Library. They had a $2.00 annual subscription fee to use these materials. The funds were used to purchase more books and eventually shelves.

In 1888, the Mechanics' Institute transferred their assets to the brand new Waterloo Free Library. By 1902, the Waterloo Free Library contained 7,013 works. In 1902, $10,000 were granted by Andrew Carnegie to build the Carnegie Library building (located at 40 Albert St, across from the current Main Branch).

First librarian
Emma Belle Roos served as Waterloo's librarian from 1905 to 1949. She was born November 15, 1880, to Henry and Mary Ann (née Springer) Roos and was the granddaughter of former Waterloo mayor Moses Springer. Roos began her career as librarian in 1905 when the city's Carnegie library opened. She had previously worked as part-time librarian of the free library that had been housed at city hall, a position she began at the age of 21. By 1948 the library holdings at grown to 17,000 books and Roos, who spent many years working alone, had a full-time assistant. She retired on August 1, 1949, and was honoured during a dinner held at the Walper Hotel and attended by Waterloo mayor Vernon Bauman. Roos died on December 9, 1970, at 90 years of age and was buried at Mount Hope Cemetery in Kitchener.

Eastside Branch 
Since 2015, plans for the Eastside Branch Library have been underway. In September 2020, the tender for constructing the library was awarded to Fortis Construction Group at $7 million. The library's design was created by John MacDonald Architect and Ward 99 Architects. The library is built into the existing RIM Park Manulife Sportsplex, located in East Waterloo. The Record estimated that "a typical Waterloo household will pay $19 annually to operate the new library". The library is includes computers, a fireplace, a "maker space", and a band practice room, with architect David Warne stating: 
The Eastside Branch opened May 7, 2022.

Branches

WPL has four branches:

See also
 List of public libraries in Ontario

References

External links

Public libraries in Ontario
Waterloo, Ontario
Libraries established in 1888
1888 establishments in Canada